Băiculești is a commune in Argeș County, Muntenia, Romania. It is composed of ten villages: Alunișu, Anghinești, Argeșani, Băiculești, Mănicești, Stejari, Tutana, Valea Brazilor, Valea lui Enache and Zigoneni.

References

Communes in Argeș County
Localities in Muntenia